Schumacher Racing Products (or just Schumacher) is a British manufacturer of radio-controlled cars and accessories with a primary focus on high-end racing products.

History

Foundation
The founder, Cecil Schumacher, was a Cosworth transmission engineer who was recruited from Borg Warner to lead the design team to adapt the Hobbs transmission (which he had worked on) to handle the Cosworth DFV's power. Cecil spotted his workmates driving radio-controlled cars on the company's helipad and decided it needed a ball differential after noticing the cars skittered.   He soon started noticing large areas that these early primitive cars could be improved. Having noticed high tyre wear he introduced the ball differential to radio-controlled cars.

These ball differentials were used by his son Robin then his friends then local model shop requested to stock it and soon international orders followed. It came to the point that Cecil Schumacher was making more money from this side business than through his employer. So in 1981 Schumacher Racing Products was formed in Northampton, England.

The company has always operated out of Northampton but sourced some components from China like most other successful RC companies; however, the majority of manufacturing remains in England and Schumacher remains very much an English company. Cecil Schumacher's son Robin Schumacher took over the business in 2001.

1980s
The first car to be produced by Schumacher was the XL Lexan chassis pan car in 1981 which had intentionally highly flexible chassis suitable for indoor racing. This was followed in 1983 by the "C" car which was made out of fibreglass reinforced epoxy resin sheet and designed specifically for racing on carpet. It included many features that are still around on every modern 1/12-scale car; race wins include the euros in 1985 and 1988.

In the latter half of the 1980s, off-road RC cars increased in popularity. In 1986 the first 4WD 1/10-scale off-road buggy was launched, called the SWB CAT. This launched the CAT (Competition All Terrain) brand for Schumacher. This first variant SWB (Standard Wheel Base) 4WD car was an instant success with serious RC fans with its popularity cemented into history when Masami Hirosaka won the 1987 IFMAR off-road RC World Championships having been lent a works car after Schumacher scouts noted his driving form during practice sessions.

1990s
Following the success of the first generation of off-road CATs, Schumacher continued to produce many successful off and on-road electric cars. The popularity of the touring car class seriously affected the off-road world during the 1990s. Schumacher stepped down the development of this class through the 1990s. Schumacher was then starting to dominate a niche in the "fun" car sector, with high-power/speed nitro-powered models capable of real speeds in excess of 80 mph.

2000s
Over the turn of this century the Schumacher product line-up became quite familiar with the "fun" cars with increasing number of nitro products; however it remained in the 1/10 competition touring cars market.

2010s
The flood of cheap high-volume low-margin ready to run cars produced in Asia meant the company no longer produce a nitro car or fun car. Schumacher now concentrate on the high level 1/10-scale electrical competitive market. Alongside their Mi touring car range the company re-entered the off-road scene with the CAT SX (4WD) and Cougar SV (2WD). Vintage racing of older designed cars became popular with Schumacher re-releasing the CAT XLS in 2017 and then the Top Cat. In the mid 2010s a move was made to help the sport grow with the introduction of a number of lower priced competition cars. The Mi1 touring car was introduced alongside the ever evolving top spec version. And then a move was made to re-establish 1/12th electric carpet racing with the launch of the Supastock and Eclipse range. It also increased its distrution business of other none competing RC products.

2020s
In January 2020 Schumacher won IFMAR 1/12 World Championships held in Milton Keynes

Racing Success

IFMAR World Championships

European Championships
1985 - Andy Dobson 1:12
1988 - Phil Davies 1:12
1988 - Jürgen Lauterbach, 3rd 1:12

ROAR National Championships

BRCA Nationals
BRCA

National Manufacturer Series
Great Britain See Schumacher BTCC

Competition cars

1/10-scale 4WD off-road buggies

1/10-scale 2WD off-road buggies

1/10 4WD electric touring car

1/12 2WD Electric Pan Car

1/12 GT12 circuit and 1/12 oval

Formula 1 RC

Other Cars

References

Works cited

External links
 Official website  http://www.racing-cars.com
 Official Facebook Page  http://www.facebook.com/SchumacherRC/
 Independent Fan Forum  http://www.oople.com/forums/
 Many dedicated Facebook groups exist

 
Radio-controlled car manufacturers
Toy companies established in 1980
1980 establishments in England